Danilo Fernando Avelar (born 9 June 1989) is a Brazilian professional footballer who plays as a left-back and centre back for América Mineiro, on loan from Corinthians.

Club career

Early career
Avelar began his career in Brazil. Avelar played for Paranavaí, Joinville, Paraná Clube and Rio Claro.

Karpaty Lviv
On 10 May 2010, he joined Karpaty Lviv in Ukrainian Premier League on loan until December 2010. Avelar impressed enough and signed for the club permanently in 2010.

Schalke (loan)
In January 2011, he joined FC Schalke 04 on loan, the new head coach of FC Schalke 04 announced on 23 March 2011 that the club would not be taking up the option to sign Avelar on a permanent deal, during his time at FC Schalke 04, Avelar won the DFB-Pokal Cup. Avelar returned on 30 June 2011 to his club Karpaty Lviv.

Cagliari
On 17 July 2012, Avelar transferred to Cagliari on loan with the option of a permanent transfer. He made his debut in Serie A on 26 August 2012 in a 2–0 loss against Genoa. After going through a difficult start (the then Sardinian coach Massimo Ficcadenti preferred the defender Francesco Pisano in his role) with the arrival of the coaches Ivo Pulga and Diego López he won a permanent place among the starters thanks to his gradually more convincing performances. In the latter part of the season he was dropped in favour of the young full-back Nicola Murru, due to small physical problems and the exponential growth of the latter. At the end of the season the option to buy was exercised by the Sardinian club at a cost of 1 million euros.

In the 2013–2014 season, he lost the starting spot again to Murru, finding scant attention in the first half of the season. On 31 January 2014 a loan move to Sky Bet Championship side Leeds United failed due to logistic problems between the two companies involved. However, in the second half of the season he made 15 appearances, starting in the match against Inter Milan on match day 25th of the Italian Serie A. His starting spot duel with Murru continued till the end of the season.

On 19 October 2014 he scored his first goal for Cagliari in their Serie A match at home to Sampdoria which ended 2–2, turning in the penalty that opened the scoring for Cagliari, at which point they were behind 2–0. A week later, however, he scored his first brace in the Italian top flight - the first goal a free kick, the second a penalty - in the 4–0 win which saw the Rossoblu impose themselves on Empoli.

Torino
On 17 June 2015, Torino released a statement confirming they had signed Avelar to a four-year contract for an undisclosed fee and an option on Antonio Barreca.

On 31 August 2017, Avelar was loaned to Ligue 1 side Amiens for one season.

Style of play
Naturally left-footed, he plays mainly on the left side of defence in a full back role or in a more attacking role as a wide midfielder, given his offensive skills.

Career statistics

Club

Honours

Club
Schalke 04
 DFB-Pokal: 2010–11

Corinthians
Campeonato Paulista: 2019

Individual
Campeonato Paulista Team of the Year: 2019

References

External links
 Profile at FFU Official Site 

1989 births
Living people
Brazilian footballers
Brazilian expatriate footballers
Expatriate footballers in Ukraine
Brazilian expatriate sportspeople in Ukraine
Expatriate footballers in Germany
Expatriate footballers in Italy
Expatriate footballers in France
Rio Claro Futebol Clube players
FC Karpaty Lviv players
Joinville Esporte Clube players
Paraná Clube players
FC Schalke 04 players
Cagliari Calcio players
Torino F.C. players
Amiens SC players
Sport Club Corinthians Paulista players
América Futebol Clube (MG) players
Ukrainian Premier League players
Bundesliga players
Serie A players
Ligue 1 players
Campeonato Brasileiro Série A players
Association football fullbacks